Nguyễn Tài Lộc (born 16 December 1989) is a Vietnamese footballer who plays as an attacking midfielder for V.League 1 club SHB Đà Nẵng.

References 

1989 births
Living people
Vietnamese footballers
Association football midfielders
People from Long An Province
V.League 1 players
SHB Da Nang FC players
Long An FC players